Lists of PlayStation Store games cover video games that can be downloaded from the online PlayStation Store. The lists are organized by type of video game console and by region.

PS one Classics

Lists of PS one Classics
List of PS one Classics (Japan)
List of PS one Classics (North America)
List of PS one Classics (PAL region)

PlayStation 3 

List of PlayStation 3 games (A–C)
List of PlayStation 3 games (D–I)
List of PlayStation 3 games (J–P)
List of PlayStation 3 games (Q–Z)
List of PlayStation 2 Classics for PlayStation 3

PlayStation 4 

List of PlayStation 4 games
List of PlayStation 2 games for PlayStation 4

PlayStation 5 
List of PlayStation 5 games

Other

List of downloadable PlayStation Portable games
List of PlayStation minis
List of PlayStation Store TurboGrafx-16 games
List of PlayStation Mobile games
NEOGEO Station